WAGS Miami is an American reality documentary television series that premiered on October 2, 2016, on E! television network, making it the first spin-off of WAGS. The reality show chronicles both the professional and personal lives of several WAGs (an acronym for wives and girlfriends of sportspersons). Amber Mazzola and Lori Gordon serve as executive producers for the series.

Overview and casting
On May 5, 2016, the network ordered WAGS Miami, to serve as the first spin-off to  WAGS. It was also revealed the executive producers of WAGS, Amber Mazzola and Lori Gordon, would serve as the series' executive producers for WAGS Miami, and the series is produced and distributed by Machete Productions. It was revealed that the series would follow the same former of its producers by featuring wives and girlfriends of sports stars, however it would be centered in and around Miami. On August 2, 2016, it was revealed that the first season would consist of 8 1-hour-long episodes and features 7 women. The women featured include, Astrid Bavaresco; Vanessa Cole the girlfriend of Mike Wallace; Darnell Nicole the ex fiancée of Reshad Jones; Ashley Nicole Roberts the fiancée of Philip Wheeler; Claudia Sampedro fiancée of Julius Peppers; Metisha Schaefer the ex-girlfriend of Larry English; and Hencha Voigt. The series premiered on October 2, 2016. It was announced on the Reunion Special that WAGS Miami had been renewed for a second season.

On May 4, 2017, it was announced the second season would premiere on August 20, 2017.

Cancellation
WAGS Miami was cancelled on February 1, 2018 due to declining ratings.

Cast

Episodes

Series overview

Season 1 (2016)

Season 2 (2017)

See also
WAGS (TV series)
WAGS Atlanta
WAGs Boutique
WAG Nation

References

External links 
 

2010s American reality television series
2016 American television series debuts
2017 American television series endings
American television spin-offs
English-language television shows
Television shows set in Miami
E! original programming
Women in Florida